CA 27.29 is a tumor marker for breast cancer.

It is a form of glycoprotein MUC1.

References

Tumor markers